Papillifera is a genus of air-breathing land snail with a clausilium, a terrestrial pulmonate gastropod mollusc in the subfamily Alopiinae of the family Clausiliidae, the door snails.

Species
 Papillifera papillaris (O. F. Müller, 1774)
 Papillifera solida (Draparnaud, 1805) - type species
Species brought into synonymy
 Papillifera bidens (Linnaeus, 1758): synonym of Papillifera papillaris  (O. F. Müller, 1774)
 Papillifera deburghiae (Paulucci, 1878): synonym of Papillifera solida deburghiae (Paulucci, 1878)

References

  Bank, R. A. (2017). Classification of the Recent terrestrial Gastropoda of the World. Last update: July 16th, 2017.

External links
 Hartmann, J.D.W. (1840-1844). Erd- und Süsswasser-Gasteropoden der Schweiz. Mit Zugabe einiger merkwürdigen exotischen Arten, i-xx, 1-36, pl. 1-2

Clausiliidae